Cole Kmet (born March 10, 1999) is an American football tight end for the Chicago Bears of the National Football League (NFL). He played college football at Notre Dame, and was drafted by the Bears in the second round of the 2020 NFL Draft.

Early years
Kmet attended St. Viator High School in Arlington Heights, Illinois. He played baseball and football in high school. As a senior in football, he had 48 receptions for 773 yards and four touchdowns. Kmet played in the 2017 U.S. Army All-American Bowl. He committed to the University of Notre Dame to play college football.

College career

Football
As a true freshman at Notre Dame in 2017, Kmet played in all 13 games and had two receptions for 14 yards. As a sophomore in 2018, he played in 11 games and had 15 receptions for 162 yards. Kmet took over as the starting tight end his junior year in 2019. He missed the first three games of the season due to a broken collarbone. In November, he announced that he would return to Notre Dame for his senior season rather than enter the 2020 NFL Draft.

On January 2, 2020, Kmet announced he would forgo his senior season at Notre Dame and would enter the 2020 NFL Draft.

Baseball
Kmet also played baseball at Notre Dame. As a freshman in 2018, Kmet appeared in 26 games as a relief pitcher and made one start. He finished the season 2–5 with a 5.05 earned run average (ERA), 39 strikeouts and a team-leading eight saves. As a sophomore in 2019, Kmet appeared in eight games with one start, before suffering an arm injury. He finished the season 0–2 with a 2.89 ERA and 27 strikeouts.

Professional career

Considered a top tight end prospect for the 2020 NFL Draft, CBS Sports ranked him as the best tight end in the draft, while Pro Football Focus ranked him as the second-best. He was projected as a second-round pick. The Chicago Bears selected him in the second round with 43rd overall pick, which was previously acquired from the Las Vegas Raiders along with Khalil Mack as part of the trade that sent two first-round picks (Josh Jacobs and Damon Arnette) to the Raiders. He signed a four-year rookie contract with the team on July 21.

Kmet began his rookie season primarily as a blocker. In Week 2 against the New York Giants, he recorded his first NFL reception with a 12-yard catch, followed by his first touchdown four games later against the Carolina Panthers on a nine-yard score in the 23–16 victory.

Kmet appeared in all 17 games for the Bears and caught 60 passes for 612 yards during the 2021 season.

Bears offensive coordinator Luke Getsy was optimistic about Kmet, who did not catch a touchdown pass in 2021. He commented on Kmet's versatility stating, "You talk about a guy that we hope can do a lot of different things. We’ve lined him up wide. We've let him do some routes outside. We've brought him in tight. We've put him in line and making him block the big boys up front too and I think the cool part about him is that he can do all of that stuff really well." During the 2022 season, Kmet recorded 50 receptions for 544 yards and seven touchdowns. He led the Bears in receptions, receiving touchdowns, and receiving yards.

NFL statistics

Personal life
Kmet's father Frank Kmet and uncle Jeff Zgonina have played in the NFL.

References

External links
Chicago Bears bio
Notre Dame Fighting Irish football bio
Notre Dame Fighting Irish baseball bio

1999 births
Living people
American football tight ends
Baseball pitchers
Baseball players from Illinois
Chicago Bears players
Notre Dame Fighting Irish baseball players
Notre Dame Fighting Irish football players
People from Lake County, Illinois
Players of American football from Illinois
Sportspeople from the Chicago metropolitan area